Time in Liberia is given by a single time zone, denoted as Greenwich Mean Time (GMT; UTC±00:00). Liberia shares this time zone with several other countries, including fourteen in western Africa where it was formerly known as Western Sahara Standard Time (WSST). Liberia has never observed daylight saving time (DST).

History 
Liberia first adopted the UTC offset -0:43:08 (called Liberia Mean Time; LMT) as it was the geographical central meridian on which the capital Monrovia was located. The time zone was renamed to Monrovia Mean Time in 1882. In March 1919, the offset was redefined forward by 1 minute and 22 seconds to -0:44:30. Liberia adopted Greenwich Mean Time (GMT; UTC±00:00) on 7 January 1972.

IANA time zone database 
In the IANA time zone database, Liberia is given one zone in the file zone.tab – Africa/Monrovia. "LR" refers to the country's ISO 3166-1 alpha-2 country code. Data for Liberia directly from zone.tab of the IANA time zone database; columns marked with * are the columns from zone.tab itself:

See also 
List of time zones by country
List of UTC time offsets

References

External links 
Current time in Liberia at Time.is
Time in Liberia at TimeAndDate.com

Time in Liberia